He's a Woman, She's a Man (金枝玉葉) is a 1994 Hong Kong romantic comedy film co-written and directed by Peter Chan and starring Leslie Cheung, Anita Yuen, Carina Lau, Eric Tsang and Jordan Chan. Its many awards garnered include Best Actress at the 14th Hong Kong Film Awards for Yuen and Best Original Song for "Chase" by Cheung. The film was followed by a sequel, Who's the Woman, Who's the Man?, released in 1996. The theme song "Chase" (追) appeared on Cheung's 1995 album Most Beloved.

Plot

Wing (Anita Yuen) is a sassy girl who deeply idolizes Rose (Carina Lau), a pop singer, and Rose's boyfriend, top record producer and songwriter Sam (Leslie Cheung). Rose has been groomed by Sam, achieving stardom and international acclaim. With her success, Sam decides to try his hand at bringing up a male singer.  He decides to announce a country-wide, males-only talent search, much to his former protégé's chagrin.

Wing, desperate to meet her idols, seizes this opportunity and enters the contest disguised as a male. Her childhood friend (Jordan Chan) trains her to perfect this whimsical idea.

As fate would have it, Wing succeeds in the audition thanks to the poor quality of those auditioning and in part to Rose's taunts. Rose challenges Sam to see to the idea of him bringing up a (relatively) talentless Wing.

Wing is later invited to stay at Sam and Rose's home for her musical education. Wing tries unsuccessfully to reconcile the two lovers' difference. Trouble and comedy ensue as she finds herself falling for Sam and vice versa, despite him thinking she is a man.

Cast
 Leslie Cheung as Sam Koo Ka-ming
 Carina Lau as Rose
 Anita Yuen as Lam Chi-wing
 Eric Tsang as Auntie
 Lawrence Cheng as Charles Chow Chu
 Law Kar-ying as Joseph 
 Jordan Chan as Yu Lo
 Jerry Lamb as George
 Cheung Suet-ling as Alice
 Clarence Hui as Wing's vocal instructor
 Nelson Cheung as Face at party (cameo)
 Patrick Tsui as Paul
 Joe Cheung as Peter
 Mantic Yiu as Peter's wife
 Jacob Cheung as MTV Director
 Lee Ho-lam as Roger
 Ng Chin-yan as Busty Lin
 Matthew Tang as Building security guard
 Chan Wai-lung as Wing's dance instructor
 Chen Yong-liang as Audition judge
 Liu Fung-pinh as Audition judge
 Irene as Audition judge
 May Lam as Rose's mahjong friend
 Julian as Rose's mahjong friend
 Leung Yiu-hei as Audition contestant #1
 Yu Tin-lok as Audition contestant #2
 Tsang Ho-yin as Audition contestant #3
 Yu Dai-keung as Audition contestant #4
 Fung Ka-leung as Audition contestant #5
 Tse Pak-chuen as Audition contestant #6
 Ng Ming-wai as Audition contestant #7
 Lai Wing-yan as Audition contestant #8
 Osman Hung as Audition contestant #9
 Chu Ka-yiu as Audition contestant #10
 Tang Chi-sam as Audition contestant #11
 Jason Lee Jones as Audition contestant #12
 Jimmy Lee as Audition contestant #13
 Chan Chi-ban as Old band member
 Wong Sek-ning as Old band member
 Winston Yeh as Old band member
 Hui Sek-hung as Old band member
 Cipriano Antonio as Old band member
 Pete Spurrier as Wine bar patron (uncredited)

Awards and nominations

See also
 Cross-dressing in film and television

References

External links
 IMDb entry
 HK cinemagic entry

1994 films
1994 romantic comedy films
Hong Kong romantic comedy films
Hong Kong LGBT-related films
1990s Cantonese-language films
Films directed by Peter Chan
Films about singers
Cross-dressing in film
Films set in Hong Kong
Films shot in Hong Kong
Films with screenplays by James Yuen
LGBT-related romantic comedy films
1994 LGBT-related films
1990s Hong Kong films